David Lachterman (1934–1992) was a Belgian radio and television comedian and commentary expert.

1934 births
1992 deaths
Male journalists
Belgian radio journalists
Belgian television journalists
20th-century Belgian journalists